Karyun (also Romanized as Kāryūn; also known as Karpūn and Kāryām) is a village in Bostan Rural District, Sangan District, Khvaf County, Razavi Khorasan Province, Iran. At the 2006 census, its population was 636, in 122 families.

References 

Populated places in Khaf County